Andrés Augusto Mendoza Acevedo (born April 26, 1978 in Chincha Alta), known as Andrés Mendoza, is a Peruvian former footballer.

Club career
Mendoza started playing professionally with Sporting Cristal, which he helped become national champion in his first season.

Subsequently, he represented a myriad of teams, in Belgium, Ukraine, Russia, Romania and France. He had a steady period with Club Brugge K.V., helping it win the 2002 Belgian Cup, with a hat-trick in a 3–1 one win over Excelsior Mouscron, while also netting the game's only in a 1–0 success at AC Milan, in the 2003-04 UEFA Champions League.

In 2004, Mendoza signed with FC Metalurh Donetsk, which loaned him twice during his link. After his release, he moved countries again in 2008: after a short spell with Steaua Bucureşti, he joined Monarcas Morelia in Mexico, being the second best goalscorer in the league's Apertura 2008, with 10 goals in 16 games.

In 2010, Mendoza signed with Columbus Crew of Major League Soccer as a Designated Player. He was released by the club at the end of the 2011 season.

International career

Mendoza made his debuts with Peru in 1999, becoming a regular fixture in the following years. He represented the nation at two Copa América tournaments: 2004 and 2007, totalling seven scoreless appearances.

After a failed campaign to qualify for the 2006 FIFA World Cup, he was called by national coach Julio César Uribe for a two-friendly match squad against Ecuador, in June 2007. He was used as a substitute the first game against their northern neighbors (win), and started in the second (0-2 loss).

On December 7, 2007, Mendoza was one in a group of internationals that were found guilty of having introduced women and alcohol into the national squad's hotel two days before Peru's away drubbing at the hands of Ecuador (5-1, in which he scored), being subsequently banned for one-and-a-half years from representing Peru. Months later he was the only one who did not get his suspension eliminated after all the other player's suspensions were reduced.

Honours

Sporting Cristal
Peruvian League: 1996
Clausura Tournament: 1998
Libertadores Cup: Runner-up 1997

Club Brugge
Belgian League: 2002–03
Belgian Cup: 2001–02, 2003–04
Belgian Supercup: 2002, 2003
Bruges Matins: 2000, 2001, 2004

Marseille
UEFA Intertoto Cup: 2005

Monarcas Morelia
InterLiga: Runner-up 2009

Career statistics

International goals
Scores and results list Peru's goal tally first.

Notes

References

External links
 
 
 
 
 

1978 births
Living people
People from Ica Region
Association football forwards
Peruvian footballers
Peruvian expatriate footballers
Peru international footballers
Peruvian Primera División players
Sporting Cristal footballers
Belgian Pro League players
Club Brugge KV players
Ukrainian Premier League players
FC Metalurh Donetsk players
Ligue 1 players
Olympique de Marseille players
Russian Premier League players
FC Dynamo Moscow players
Columbus Crew players
Liga I players
FC Steaua București players
Liga MX players
Atlético Morelia players
Atlante F.C. footballers
Süper Lig players
Diyarbakırspor footballers
1999 Copa América players
2004 Copa América players
2007 Copa América players
Expatriate footballers in France
Expatriate footballers in Romania
Expatriate footballers in Ukraine
Expatriate footballers in Russia
Expatriate footballers in Turkey
Expatriate footballers in Belgium
Expatriate footballers in Mexico
Expatriate soccer players in the United States
Peruvian expatriate sportspeople in France
Peruvian expatriate sportspeople in Romania
Peruvian expatriate sportspeople in Ukraine
Peruvian expatriate sportspeople in Russia
Peruvian expatriate sportspeople in Turkey
Peruvian expatriate sportspeople in Belgium
Peruvian expatriate sportspeople in Mexico
Peruvian expatriate sportspeople in the United States
Major League Soccer players
Designated Players (MLS)